Schinokapsala is a community and a small village in Lasithi on Crete. It is situated 21 kilometers north-east from Ierapetra  and 6 km from the sea. Since 2011 it belongs to the Ierapetra municipality.

It is built 400 meters above sea level, south of Thripti mountain, in a verdant area, full of pine and olive trees. The community of Schinokapsala consists of Schinokapsala proper and the seaside settlements Galini, Achlia, and Mavros Kolympos. Today it is almost deserted, with a population of 87 people recorded in the 2011 census. A majority of the population have moved to the beach and to Ierapetra in the last 3 decades.

The Venetian census of 1583 recorded 162 in Schinokapsala, with the name derived from the Greek word for the Kermes oak that sheltered the original settlers while they lived in caves.

External links

References 

Makry Gialos
Populated places in Lasithi